, a Japanese anime series produced by Madhouse and Aniplex, began broadcasting on TV Tokyo on April 5, 2006. The series is directed by Hiroshi Kōjina with Upper Deck Japan, a trading card game company, as the main sponsor. The anime has been licensed by Upper Deck USA and produced by ADV Films for North American distribution.

The series is more violent than other trading-card-game-tie-in animations with many characters being killed. According to an interview with the March 2006 issue of Animage, Hiroshi Kōjina, the director, noted that the show "absolutely will not have any plot elements that carry favor to children". The producer also commented that Kiba is not the type of show to put "human drama" on the back burner while concentrating on promotional tie-ins. Kiba aired on Toonami Jetstream from July 14, 2008 to January 21, 2009.

Plot

Zed, a 15-year-old boy who lives in a city called "Calm", is frustrated by his current situation in life; he feels that somewhere out there is a place where he can live more fully. One day, at the invitation of a mysterious wind, he dives into a space-time crevasse (portal), seeking the answers that might be there. Riding on the wind, he is transported to a war-torn world where magic users called "Shard Casters" fight endlessly with each other, using spells in the form of marble-like "Shards". He is transported to a country known as Templar.

With the power of the Shards, the Shard Casters are able to use spells and control monsters called "Spirits". Fascinated by that power, Zed aims to become a Shard Caster. However, he still doesn't know that residing in his body is "Amil Gaoul", a mighty Spirit with the power to influence the world's future. Amil Gaoul is one of the "Key Spirits" that, when together with the other Key Spirits, can destroy or save the world. There are a total of six Key Spirits: Amil Gaoul, Pronimo, Sachura, Monadi, Dynamis and Shadin.

Zed undergoes countless trials in order to find out who he really is and what is most important to him.

Episodes

Music

Kiba Original Soundtrack 1 

CD 1:

 zed-fate
 zed-run
 roya-pas de bourree
 zymot
 templer-fear
 enemy
 zed-nostalgia
 zed-intense
 dawn
 templer-breeze
 templer-promenade
 roya-sentiment
 noa-intense
 noa-calmness
 battle-approach
 battle-bump
 battle-chase
 zed-friends
 mother
 shard-blaze
 shard-battle
 zed-regret
 urban
 zed-journey
 Sanctuary [TV ver.]
 Very Very [TV ver.]
 solar wind [TV ver.]

CD 2:

 Wind of Power
 Go Smiler

Kiba Original Soundtrack 2

Disc 1

 zed-fate
 war
 plot
 joy
 scene-forest
 scene-lake
 scene-desert
 underground
 neotopia
 roya-romance
 fanfare
 roya-destiny
 noa-friends
 disaster
 darkness
 secret
 seekers
 shard-battle ~ perish
 universe
 tears
 anger
 zed-friends (alternative take)
 Hakanaku Tsuyoku (TV ver.)
 STAY GOLD (TV ver.)
 Sekai no Hate Made (TV ver.)

Disc 2

 Mei no Naki Kaze ni Fukarete
 Kaze no Fuku Basho

References

External links
 Official Site 
 Kiba Blog at Aniplex 
 

2006 Japanese television series debuts
2007 Japanese television series endings
ADV Films
Adventure anime and manga
Anime series
Anime with original screenplays
Aniplex
Dark fantasy anime and manga
Isekai anime and manga
Madhouse (company)
Shows on Toonami Jetstream
TV Tokyo original programming